Phrygilus is a genus of mainly Andean seed-eating tanagers commonly known as sierra finches. Phrygilos means finch in Ancient Greek.  Traditionally classified in the bunting and American sparrow family Emberizidae, more recent studies have shown them to belong in the Thraupidae.

Taxonomy and species list
The genus Phrygilus was introduced in 1844 by the German ornithologist Jean Cabanis with the grey-hooded sierra finch as the type species. The name is from the Ancient Greek phrugilos, an unidentified bird mentioned
by Aristophanes.

The genus formerly included additional species. A molecular phylogenetic study published in 2014 found that the genus was highly polyphyletic and in the resulting reorganization members of the genus were moved to Geospizopsis, Rhopospina, Porphyrospiza and Idiopsar. The genus now contains four species.

References

 
Bird genera